Velibor Kopunović (born 25 November 1975) is a Serbian-Croatian football manager and former player who played as a striker.

During his journeyman career, Kopunović represented numerous clubs from several countries, namely, Serbia (Spartak Subotica, Čukarički Stankom and Zlatibor Voda), the Faroe Islands (VB Vágur), Hungary (Vác FC-Zollner and Újpest), Germany (Dynamo Dresden, Hallescher FC and Sachsen Leipzig), Austria (Kapfenberger SV), Finland (Tampere United), China (Chongqing Lifan and Qingdao Zhongneng) and Greece (Pyrsos Grevena and Anagennisi Epanomi).

After retireing, he started his coaching career. He took charge of FK Stepojevac Vaga of Serbian League Belgrade in 2019–20 season.

He is the younger brother of fellow former footballer Goran Kopunović.

References

External links
 HLSZ profile
 Veikkausliiga profile
 FaroeSoccer profile
 Fc Balzan Malta Season 2018/2019 - National Cup Winners
 Velibor Kopunovic Linkedin Profile

1975 births
Living people
Sportspeople from Subotica
Serbia and Montenegro footballers
Serbian footballers
Association football forwards
FK Spartak Subotica players
VB Vágur players
FK Čukarički players
Vác FC players
Dynamo Dresden players
Hallescher FC players
FC Sachsen Leipzig players
Kapfenberger SV players
Veikkausliiga players
Tampere United players
Chinese Super League players
Chongqing Liangjiang Athletic F.C. players
Qingdao Hainiu F.C. (1990) players
Nemzeti Bajnokság I players
Újpest FC players
Serbia and Montenegro expatriate footballers
Serbian expatriate footballers
Expatriate footballers in the Faroe Islands
Expatriate footballers in Hungary
Expatriate footballers in Germany
Expatriate footballers in Austria
Expatriate footballers in Finland
Expatriate footballers in China
Expatriate footballers in Greece
Serbian expatriate sportspeople in the Faroe Islands
Serbian expatriate sportspeople in Hungary
Serbian expatriate sportspeople in Germany
Serbian expatriate sportspeople in Austria
Serbian expatriate sportspeople in Finland
Serbian expatriate sportspeople in China
Serbian expatriate sportspeople in Greece
Serbian football managers